Qaracıq (also, Qaracık and Qaracek) is a village in the municipality of Qaracik Zeyid in the Khachmaz Rayon of Azerbaijan.

References

Populated places in Khachmaz District